KVR may refer to:
 Kettle Valley Railway, discontinued railway company in Canada
 Kangra Valley Railway, Mountain railway in Himachal Pradesh, India
 K29HW-D, formerly known as KVR-TV, a student television station in Austin, Texas